Brink's: The Great Robbery is a 1976 American crime drama television film. It stars Leslie Nielsen and is based on the Great Brink's Robbery in Boston in 1950.

External links

1976 television films
1976 crime drama films
1976 films
American crime drama films
Films directed by Marvin J. Chomsky
Films set in 1950
Films set in Boston
Crime films based on actual events
Films scored by Richard Markowitz
American drama television films
1970s English-language films
1970s American films